Ahmet Câmî-i Rûmî also known as Câmî-i Mısrî was an Ottoman official, poet and translator who flourished in the 16th century.

Biography
Almost nothing is known about Câmî-i Rûmî apart from his career. Not even the dates and places of his birth and death are known. He served as a soldier in the royal Ottoman court in Constantinople (present-day Istanbul, Turkey) before being appointed treasurer in the Egypt Eyalet under Sultan Suleiman the Magnificent (1520–1566). While in Egypt, four of his sons died during a plague. Câmî-i Rûmî was subsequently sent to Mecca for three years, where he oversaw the renovation of the Ka'aba.

Thereafter, he returned to Constantinople, where he received promotion before leaving for Egypt once again. During his second stay in Egypt he translated Husayn Kashifi's Rawżat ol-šohadāʾ from Persian into Turkish for Sultan Suleiman. He entitled his translation the Sa'adat-nama; he used simple language, but embellished it with poems of Turkish and Persian poets. He received recognition for the quality of his translation, and was subsequently appointed governor of a sanjak in Egypt. He continued serving as governor under Sultan Murad III (1574–1595).

Osman G. Özgüdenli notes that Câmî-i Rûmî's writings were never collected in a divan. However, he adds that some of his poems are found in tazkeras and anthologies. There are many extant manuscripts of Câmî-i Rûmî's translation. The oldest (dated 1578) is stored at the Topkapı Palace Library.

Notes

References

Sources
 

16th-century poets from the Ottoman Empire
16th-century Ottoman military personnel
Translators from Persian
16th-century deaths
Civil servants from the Ottoman Empire
Male poets from the Ottoman Empire